Mark K. Updegrove (born August 25, 1961) is an American author, historian, journalist, and Presidential Historian for ABC News. He is the president and CEO of the LBJ Foundation in Austin, Texas. Previously, he served as the director of the Lyndon Baines Johnson Library and Museum for eight years.

He is the author of five books including his latest, The Last Republicans: Inside the Extraordinary Relationship Between George H.W. Bush and George W. Bush, published in 2017. His latest book, Incomparable Grace: JFK in the Presidency, was published by Dutton in April 2022. He is also the executive producer of the CNN original series "LBJ: Triumph and Tragedy."

Background
Updegrove was born outside Philadelphia in Abington, PA, on Aug. 25, 1961. He attended high school at the George School, which honored him with its Distinguished Alumnus Award in 2015. In 1984, he graduated from the University of Maryland, College Park.

Career
In December 2017, Updegrove was named the president and CEO of the LBJ Foundation in Austin, Texas. From 2009 to 2017, he was the fourth director of the Lyndon Baines Johnson Presidential Library in Austin, Texas.

As director of the LBJ Library, in 2014, Updegrove hosted the Civil Rights Summit, an historic three-day conference around the fiftieth anniversary of the Civil Rights Act, which included a keynote address by then President Barack Obama and programs with former Presidents George W. Bush, Bill Clinton, and Jimmy Carter, as well as programs with many civil rights activists including Julian Bond, John Lewis, and Andrew Young. The summit garnered international news coverage, including the New York Times profile on Updegrove titled, "Chronicler of Presidents Brings Four Together."

In April 2016, Updegrove hosted the Vietnam War Summit, a three-day conference, featuring a keynote address by then Secretary of State John Kerry. Among the additional participants were Henry Kissinger, Ken Burns, Tom Hayden and Bob Kerrey.

Early in his tenure at the library, Updegrove oversaw the $11 million renovation of the library's core exhibit on Lyndon Johnson and his administration, which opened in December 2012.

Updegrove's December 2014 Politico article, What 'Selma' Gets Wrong, ignited a controversy over the portrayal of Lyndon Johnson as an obstructionist on voting rights in the film Selma, touching off a debate about the importance of accuracy in films based on historic events. In January 2015, Updegrove addressed the issue on CBS' Face the Nation.

Updegrove has conducted exclusive interviews with seven U.S. Presidents: Joe Biden , Barack Obama, George W. Bush, Bill Clinton, George H. W. Bush, Jimmy Carter, and Gerald R. Ford.

He has also interviewed First Ladies Laura Bush, Hillary Clinton, Barbara Bush, Nancy Reagan, and Rosalynn Carter; Vice Presidents Dick Cheney, and Walter Mondale; Supreme Court Justices Sandra Day O’Connor, Ruth Bader Ginsburg, and Neil Gorsuch; Cabinet secretaries Henry Kissinger, James Baker, Madeleine Albright, Condoleezza Rice, Robert Gates, Eric Holder, and John Kerry; and others including: Mikhail Gorbachev, Nancy Pelosi, John Lewis, John Glenn, Dr. Anthony Fauci,</ref> Andrew Young, Julian Bond, Doris Kearns Goodwin, Dan Rather, Hank Aaron, Ken Burns, Bryan Cranston, Woody Harrelson, Rob Reiner, Robert Redford, and Bob Woodward and Carl Bernstein.

Updegrove spent much of his early career in magazine publishing, including serving the publisher of Newsweek in New York, president of Time Canada, Time magazine's separate Canadian edition and operation, and Time magazine's  Los Angeles manager.

Books

Updegrove's latest book, Incomparable Grace: JFK in the Presidency was published in April 2022. His previous book, The Last Republicans: Inside the Extraordinary Relationship Between George H.W. Bush and George W. Bush, was published in November 2017 with exclusive stories featured in the New York Times and on CNN, which reported on the book's revelations about the Bushes’ views on Donald Trump. Through exclusive interviews with Updegrove, the book quotes former President George H.W. Bush as calling Donald Trump "a blowhard," and saying flatly, "I don't like him," while former President George W. Bush is quoted as saying, "Wow, this guy doesn't know what it means to be president." When asked for his reaction to the Bushes' comments, President Trump, en route to Tokyo for a thirteen-day tour of Asia, said, "I'll comment after we come back. I don't want to make headlines. I don't want to make their move successful." The book was addressed by Stephen Colbert in his monologue on The Late Show with Stephen Colbert.

Updegrove is the author of five books:
Second Acts: Presidential Lives and Legacies After the White House (Lyons Press, 2006)
Baptism By Fire: Eight Presidents Who Took Office During Times of Crisis (St. Martins Press, 2009)
Indomitable Will: LBJ in the Presidency (Crown Publishers, 2012)
The Last Republicans: Inside the Extraordinary Relationship Between George H.W. Bush and George W. Bush (HarperCollins, November 2017), which includes material from exclusive interviews with both Bush presidents
Incomparable Grace: JFK in the Presidency (Dutton, 2022)

Journalism

Updegrove has written for The Daily Beast, The Hill, The Nation, National Geographic, The New York Times, Parade, Politico, Texas Monthly,Time, and USA Today, and his books have been excerpted in American Heritage, Parade, Politico,and Texas Monthly.

Television Commentator

Updegrove is the presidential historian for ABC News and a consultant for CNN. He also appears regularly on CNN and MSNBC, has contributed to CBS Sunday Morning, and has been a guest on all major news outlets including The CBS Evening News, Face the Nation, Morning Joe, NBC Nightly News, NPR's Morning Edition and All Things Considered, PBS NewsHour. He has also been on The Daily Show and played himself in the Epix series Graves.
 
Additionally, Updegrove has also appeared in numerous documentaries and original series including PBS’ The White House: The Inside Story; CNN’s The Bush Years, and Race for the White House; MSNBC's Betrayal: The Plot that Won the White House; NFL Films' Sigma Chi and the Mayflower Move / the Baltimore Colts; and History TV's Presidents at War, The Ultimate Guide to the Presidents, and What the Hell's the Presidency For?  He is featured in CNN’s upcoming special series, LBJ: Triumph and Tragedy, for which he served as executive producer.

Adjunct Professor/Lecturer

Along with LBJ Presidential Library director and former University of Texas associate professor, Mark Lawrence, Updegrove co-teaches "The Johnson Years," a course for Liberal Arts Honors students at the University of Texas at Austin.

Updegrove has lectured at numerous colleges and universities, including Harvard, Rice, the University of Virginia, and the University of Pennsylvania. He gave the commencement address for Texas State University in 2019. He has also done programs at the Library of Congress, the National Archives, and the White House Historical Association.

Personal life

Updegrove is married to Amy Banner Updegrove, a marketing consultant who formerly served as publisher of Texas Monthly and president of Los Angeles Magazine. Both have two children from previous marriages. They live in Austin, TX.

References

External links

Statesman April 7, 2012
The Daily Texan Feb 1, 2011

1961 births
Living people
Writers from Philadelphia
21st-century American historians
21st-century American male writers
Directors of museums in the United States
Historians from Pennsylvania
George School alumni
American male non-fiction writers